The 2022 Tour de Luxembourg was the 82nd edition of the Tour de Luxembourg road cycling stage race. It started on 13 September and finished on 17 September, as part of the 2022 UCI ProSeries.

Teams 

UCI WorldTeams

 
 
 
 
 
 

UCI ProTeams

 
 
 
 
 
 
 
 
 

UCI Continental Teams

Route

Stages

Stage 1 
13 September 2022 — Stade de Luxembourg to Luxembourg City (Kirchberg),

Stage 2 
14 September 2022 — Junglinster to Schifflange,

Stage 3 
15 September 2022 — Rosport to Diekirch,

Stage 4 
16 September 2022 — Remich to Remich,  (ITT)

Stage 5 
17 September 2022 — Mersch to Luxembourg City (Limpertsberg),

Classification leadership table

Final classification standings

General classification

Points classification

Mountains classification

Young rider classification

Team classification

References

External links 

Tour de Luxembourg
Tour de Luxembourg
Tour de Luxembourg
Tour de Luxembourg
Tour de Luxembourg